Grevillea renwickiana is a species of flowering plant in the family Proteaceae and is endemic to south-eastern New South Wales. It is a prostrate, mat-forming shrub with pinnatifid to pinnatipartite leaves and clusters of cream-coloured to pale pink and purplish flowers.

Description
The edges of the leaves are turned down, and the lower surface with loose, silky hairs. Flowering occurs in November and December and the fruit is a hairy follicle.

Taxonomy
Grevillea renwickiana was first formally described in 1887 by Ferdinand von Mueller in the Proceedings of the Linnean Society of New South Wales from specimens collected by William Baeuerlen "on heath-ground near the Little River in the Braidwood district, at an elevation of about ". The specific epithet (renwickiana) honours Sir Arthur Renwick.

Distribution and habitat
This grevillea grows in open forest in the Braidwood-Nerriga area of south-eastern New South Wales.

References

renwickiana
Flora of New South Wales
Proteales of Australia
Taxa named by Ferdinand von Mueller
Plants described in 1887